Vosmaeropsis is a genus of sponges in the family, Heteropiidae, and was first described in 1893 by Arthur Dendy. The type species by subsequent designation is Vosmaeropsis macera (Carter, 1886).

Distribution 
GBIF with just 25 georeferenced specimens in this genus, shows it with an apparent world-wide distribution. The  Australian Faunal Directory shows as being found on/off the coast of Victoria, and the coasts of north-west and south-west Western Australia.

Accepted species 
(according to WoRMS)

 Vosmaeropsis complanatispinifera Cavalcanti, Bastos & Lanna, 2015
 Vosmaeropsis connexiva (Poléjaeff, 1883)
 Vosmaeropsis cyathus (Verrill, 1873)
 Vosmaeropsis depressa Dendy, 1893
 Vosmaeropsis gardineri Ferrer-Hernandez, 1916
 Vosmaeropsis glebula Van Soest & De Voogd, 2018
 Vosmaeropsis grisea Tanita, 1939
 Vosmaeropsis hispanica Ferrer Hernández, 1933
 Vosmaeropsis hozawai Borojevic & Klautau, 2000
 Vosmaeropsis inflata Tanita, 1942
 Vosmaeropsis japonica Hôzawa, 1929
 Vosmaeropsis levis Hôzawa, 1940
 Vosmaeropsis macera (Carter, 1886)
 Vosmaeropsis mackinnoni Dendy & Frederick, 1924
 Vosmaeropsis maculata Hôzawa, 1929
 Vosmaeropsis oruetai Ferrer-Hernández, 1918
 Vosmaeropsis ovata Tanita, 1942
 Vosmaeropsis recruta Cavalcanti, Bastos & Lanna, 2015
 Vosmaeropsis sasakii Hôzawa, 1929
 Vosmaeropsis sericata (Ridley, 1881)
 Vosmaeropsis simplex Hôzawa, 1940
 Vosmaeropsis spinosa Tanita, 1943
 Vosmaeropsis triradiata Hôzawa, 1940
 Vosmaeropsis wilsoni Dendy, 1893

References

External links 

Taxa named by Arthur Dendy
Animals described in 1893